Gymnosporia is an Old World genus of plants, that comprise suffrutices, shrubs and trees. It was formerly considered congeneric with Maytenus, but more recent investigations separated it based on the presence of achyblasts (truncated branchlets) and spines, alternate leaves or fascicles of leaves, an inflorescence that forms a dichasium, mostly unisexual flowers, and fruit forming a dehiscent capsule, with an aril on the seed. It is dioecious, with male and female flowers on separate plants.

Range
The genus occurs in all of Africa, Madagascar and adjacent islands, southern Spain, the Middle East, Afghanistan, Pakistan, India, Sri Lanka, Thailand, Vietnam, southern China, Taiwan, the Ryukyu Islands, Malesia, and in Queensland, Australia. In the Afrotropical realm the two main centers of diversity are in the south and the northeast.

Species
The genus includes some 114 species:

 Gymnosporia acuminata Hook.f. ex M.A.Lawson
 Gymnosporia addat Loes.
 Gymnosporia alaternifolia (Tul.) Loes.
 Gymnosporia annobonensis Loes. & Mildbr.
 Gymnosporia arbutifolia (Hochst. ex A.Rich.) Loes.
 Gymnosporia arenicola Jordaan
 Gymnosporia austroyunnanensis (S.J.Pei & Y.H.Li) M.P.Simmons
 Gymnosporia bachmannii Loes.
 Gymnosporia bailadillana V.Naray. & Mooney
 Gymnosporia baumii Loes.
 Gymnosporia benguelensis Loes.
 Gymnosporia beniensis Robyns & Lawalrée
 Gymnosporia berberoides W.W.Sm.
 Gymnosporia bonii Pit.
 Gymnosporia brevipetala Loes.
 Gymnosporia buchananii Loes.
 Gymnosporia buxifolia (L.) Szyszyl.
 Gymnosporia buxifolioides Loes.
 Gymnosporia capitata (E.Mey. ex Sond.) Loes.
 Gymnosporia cassinoides (L'Hér.) Masf.
 Gymnosporia chevalieri Tardieu
 Gymnosporia commiphoroides H.Perrier
 Gymnosporia confertiflora (J.Y.Luo & X.X.Chen) M.P.Simmons
 Gymnosporia cortii Pic.Serm.
 Gymnosporia crataegina Baker
 Gymnosporia crenata (G.Forst.) Seem.
 Gymnosporia cryptopetala Reyes-Bet. & A.Santos
 Gymnosporia devenishii Jordaan
 Gymnosporia dhofarensis (Sebsebe) Jordaan
 Gymnosporia divaricata Baker
 Gymnosporia diversifolia Maxim.
 Gymnosporia dongfangensis (F.W.Xing & X.S.Qin) M.P.Simmons
 Gymnosporia drummondii (N.Robson & Sebsebe) Jordaan
 Gymnosporia dryandri (Lowe) Masf.
 Gymnosporia elliptica (Thunb.) Schönland
 Gymnosporia emarginata (Willd.) Thwaites
 Gymnosporia engleriana Loes.
 Gymnosporia esquirolii (H.Lév.) H.Lév.
 Gymnosporia falconeri M.A.Lawson
 Gymnosporia forsskaoliana (Sebsebe) Jordaan
 Gymnosporia fruticosa (Thwaites) Thwaites
 Gymnosporia gariepensis Jordaan
 Gymnosporia glaucophylla Jordaan
 Gymnosporia gracilipes (Welw. ex Oliv.) Loes.
 Gymnosporia gracilis Loes.
 Gymnosporia grandifolia (Davison) Jordaan
 Gymnosporia grossulariae (Tul.) Loes.
 Gymnosporia guangxiensis (C.Y.Cheng & W.L.Sha) M.P.Simmons
 Gymnosporia gurueensis (N.Robson) Jordaan
 Gymnosporia hainanensis Merr. & Chun
 Gymnosporia harenensis (Sebsebe) Jordaan
 Gymnosporia harlandii Hance
 Gymnosporia harveyana Loes.
 Gymnosporia hemipterocarpa Jordaan
 Gymnosporia heterophylla (Eckl. & Zeyh.) Loes.
 Gymnosporia heyneana (Roth) M.A.Lawson
 Gymnosporia integrifolia (L.f.) Glover
 Gymnosporia intermedia Chiov.
 Gymnosporia jinyangensis (C.Y.Chang) Q.R.Liu & Funston
 Gymnosporia keniensis (Loes.) Jordaan
 Gymnosporia leptopus (Tul.) Baker
 Gymnosporia linearis (L.f.) Loes.
 Gymnosporia littoralis (Backer) Jordaan
 Gymnosporia livingstonei Jordaan
 Gymnosporia macrocarpa Jordaan
 Gymnosporia maranguensis (Loes.) Loes.
 Gymnosporia marcanii Craib
 Gymnosporia markwardii Jordaan
 Gymnosporia masindei (Gereau) Jordaan
 Gymnosporia matoboensis Jordaan
 Gymnosporia montana (Roth) Benth.
 Gymnosporia mossambicensis (Klotzsch) Loes.
 Gymnosporia neglecta M.A.Lawson
 Gymnosporia nemorosa (Eckl. & Zeyh.) Szyszyl.
 Gymnosporia nguruensis (N.Robson & Sebsebe) Jordaan
 Gymnosporia nitida Merr.
 Gymnosporia obbiadensis Chiov.
 Gymnosporia obscura (A.Rich.) Loes.
 Gymnosporia orbiculata (C.Y.Wu ex S.J.Pei & Y.H.Li) Q.R.Liu &
 Gymnosporia ovata (Wall. ex Wight & Arn.) M.A.Lawson
 Gymnosporia oxycarpa (N.Robson) Jordaan
 Gymnosporia pallida Collett & Hemsl.
 Gymnosporia parviflora (Vahl) Chiov.
 Gymnosporia pertinax (N.Hallé & J.Florence) M.P.Simmons
 Gymnosporia polyacanthus Szyszyl.
 Gymnosporia puberula M.A.Lawson
 Gymnosporia pubescens (N.Robson) Jordaan
 Gymnosporia punctata (Sebsebe) Jordaan
 Gymnosporia putterlickioides Loes.
 Gymnosporia pyria (Willemet) Jordaan
 Gymnosporia richardsiae (N.Robson & Sebsebe) Jordaan
 Gymnosporia rothiana (Walp.) M.A.Lawson
 Gymnosporia royleana Wall. ex M.A.Lawson
 Gymnosporia rubra (Harv.) Loes.
 Gymnosporia rufa (Wall.) Hook.f.
 Gymnosporia salicifolia M.A.Lawson
 Gymnosporia schliebenii Jordaan
 Gymnosporia senegalensis (Lam.) Loes.
 Gymnosporia serrata (Hochst. ex A.Rich.) Loes.
 Gymnosporia sikkimensis Prain
 Gymnosporia somalensis Loes.
 Gymnosporia spinosa (Blanco) Merr. & Rolfe
 Gymnosporia stylosa Pierre
 Gymnosporia swazica Jordaan
 Gymnosporia tenuispina (Sond.) Szyszyl.
 Gymnosporia thompsonii Merr.
 Gymnosporia thomsonii Kurz
 Gymnosporia thyrsiflora (S.J.Pei & Y.H.Li) W.B.Yu & D.Z.Li
 Gymnosporia tiaoloshanensis Chun & F.C.How
 Gymnosporia trilocularis Hayata
 Gymnosporia uniflora Davison
 Gymnosporia vanwykii (R.H.Archer) Jordaan
 Gymnosporia variabilis (Hemsl.) Loes.
 Gymnosporia wallichiana (Spreng.) M.A.Lawson
 Gymnosporia woodii Szyszyl.

References

 
Taxonomy articles created by Polbot
Celastrales genera
Taxa named by Robert Wight
Dioecious plants